The 2019 Carling Black Label Cup was the eighth edition of the Carling Black Label Cup to be held.

Venue
The FNB Stadium was chosen to host this annual event. The FNB Stadium, known as Soccer City during the 2010 FIFA World Cup, is a stadium located in Nasrec, the Soweto area of Johannesburg, South Africa.

Match

Details

Notes

Soccer cup competitions in South Africa
Carling